The Crossing is a novel by American author Cormac McCarthy, published in 1994 by Alfred A. Knopf. The story is the second installment of  McCarthy's "Border Trilogy".

Plot introduction
Like its predecessor, All the Pretty Horses (1992), The Crossing is a coming-of-age novel set on the border between the southwest United States and Mexico. The plot takes place before and during the Second World War and focuses on the life of the protagonist Billy Parham, a teenage cowboy; his family; and his younger brother Boyd. The story tells of three journeys taken from New Mexico to Mexico. It is noted for being a more melancholic novel than the first of the trilogy, without returning to the hellish bleakness of McCarthy's early novels.

Most of the protagonists are people of few words; thus the dialogues are few and concise. Additionally, since much of the interaction is with Mexican people, many parts of dialogues are written in untranslated Spanish.

Although the novel is not overtly satirical or humorous, it has many of the qualities of a picaresque: a realistic portrayal of a destitute hero embarking on a series of loosely connected, arguably doomed quests.

Plot summary
The first sojourn details a series of hunting expeditions conducted by Billy, his father, and to a lesser extent, his brother Boyd. They are attempting to locate and trap a pregnant female wolf which has been preying on cattle near the family's homestead.  McCarthy explores themes throughout the action such as the mystical passage on page 22, describing his father setting a trap:

Crouched in the broken shadow with the sun at his back and holding the trap at eyelevel against the morning sky he looked to be truing some older, some subtler instrument. Astrolabe or sextant. Like a man bent at fixing himself someway in the world.  Bent on trying by arc or chord the space between his being and the world that was. If there be such space. If it be knowable.

When Billy finally catches the animal, he harnesses her and, instead of killing her, determines to return her to the mountains of Mexico where he believes her original home is located. He develops a deep affection for and bond with the wolf, risking his life to save her on more than one occasion.

Critics disagree about the greater significance of Billy's encounters with the wolf.  Wallis Sanborn argues that “[a]lthough noble, Parham’s mission to return the captured she-wolf to Mexico is abjectly flawed . . . [it is] nothing more than a man violently controlling a wild animal through the guise of pseudo-nobility” (143).  Raymond Malewitz argues that the wolf's "literary agency" becomes visible when Billy's way of thinking about the wolf conflicts with the way the narrator describes the creature.

Along the way, Billy encounters many other travelers and inhabitants of the land who relate in a sophisticated dialogue their deepest philosophies. Take, for example, a Mormon who converts to Catholicism and describes his vision of reality in this way:

Things separate from their stories have no meaning. They are only shapes. Of a certain size and color. A certain weight. When their meaning has become lost to us they no longer have even a name. The story on the other hand can never be lost from its place in the world for it is that place. And that is what was to be found here. The corrido. The tale. And like all corridos it ultimately told one story only, for there is only one to tell.

He also meets an opera troupe performing Pagliacci in the wilds, the characters of which curiously parallel Billy and Boyd's relationship with a girl they save along their route.

He watched the play with interest but could make little of it ... in the end the man in buffoon's motley slew the woman and slew another man perhaps his rival with a dagger

In the second border crossing, Billy and Boyd have set out to recover horses stolen from their family's spread. Their relationship is a strained one, with Boyd displaying a more stubborn nature than that of his brother, a characteristic that hinders Billy's attempts to protect him. Boyd is eventually shot through the chest in a squabble. After he is nursed back to health, he disappears with a young girl.

The third crossing features Billy alone attempting to discover his brother's whereabouts. He learns Boyd has been killed in a gunfight and sets out to find his dead brother's remains, and return them to New Mexico. After finding Boyd's grave and exhuming the body, Billy is ambushed by a band of men who desecrate Boyd's remains and stab Billy's horse through the chest. Billy, with the help of a gypsy, nurses the horse back to riding condition.

The last scene shows Billy alone and desolate, coming across a terribly beat up dog that approaches him for help. In marked contrast to his youthful bond with the wolf, he shoos the dog away angrily, meanly. Later, he feels a flood of remorse: he goes after the dog, calling for it to come back—but it has gone. He breaks down in tears.

References

External links
 

1994 American novels
Novels by Cormac McCarthy
Western (genre) novels
Alfred A. Knopf books
Novels set in New Mexico
Novels set in Mexico
American historical novels
The Border Trilogy
Novels about animals
Books with cover art by Chip Kidd